Lúčky is a village and municipality in Michalovce District in the Košice Region of eastern Slovakia.

History
In historical records the village was first mentioned in 1366.

Geography
The village lies at an altitude of 107 metres and covers an area of  (2020-06-30/-07-01).

Gallery

References

External links

https://web.archive.org/web/20070513023228/http://www.statistics.sk/mosmis/eng/run.html

Villages and municipalities in Michalovce District